Satiah (also, Sitiah, Sitioh; “Daughter of the Moon”) was an ancient Egyptian queen, the Great Royal Wife of Thutmose III.

Family

Satiah was the daughter of the royal nurse Ipu. It is possible that her father was the important official Ahmose Pen-Nekhebet.  No children of Satiah are known, though there is a possibility that Prince Amenemhat – Thutmose's eldest son, who died in the 35th year of his father's reign – was her son.
Satiah died during her husband's 24 years reign and Thutmose's next Great Royal Wife was Merytre-Hatshepsut.

Biography
Satiah's titles include: King's Wife (ḥmt-nisw), Great King's Wife (ḥmt-niswt-wrt) and God's Wife (ḥmt-ntr).

Satiah is attested in several places. In Abydos the text on an offering table mentions her mother, the “nurse of the god” Ipu. The offering table was dedicated by the lector priest Therikiti. A bronze votive axe-head(?) (now in the Cairo Museum), inscribed with the name of Queen Satiah, was also found in Abydos.

At the temple of Montu at El-Tod a statue of the queen was dedicated by Tuthmose III after her death (the statue is now in the Cairo Museum).

Queen Satiahis depicted behind Queen Merytre-Hatshepsut and Thutmose III on a pillar in the tomb of the king (KV34). Behind Queen Satiah we see the King's Wife Nebtu and the King's Daughter Nefertari.

Satiah is depicted before Tuthmose III in a relief from Karnak.
A stela in the Cairo Museum shows Queen Satiah standing behind Tuthmose III.

References

Further reading
Alexandre Herrero Pardo, Satiah, 1ª Gran Esposa Real; Meritre, 2ª Gran Esposa Real; Isis, la madre del Rey  - Las mujeres en la vida de Tutmosis III - Los Nobles de Egipto

External links
Queen Sitiah (website by A. Bart)

15th-century BC Egyptian women
Queens consort of the Eighteenth Dynasty of Egypt
Wives of Thutmose III
Great Royal Wives